Thunder Bay—Atikokan is a provincial electoral district in northwestern Ontario, Canada, that has been represented in the Legislative Assembly of Ontario since 1999.

The electoral district was created from Port Arthur, Fort William, Lake Nipigon and Rainy River in 1999 when Ontario was divided into the same electoral districts as those used for federal electoral purposes. They were redistributed whenever a readjustment took place at the federal level.

In 2005, legislation was passed by the Legislature to divide Ontario into 107 electoral districts, beginning with the next provincial election in 2007. The eleven northern electoral districts, including Thunder Bay—Atikokan, are those defined for federal purposes in 1996, based on the 1991 census (except for a minor boundary adjustment). The 96 southern electoral districts are those defined for federal electoral purposes in 2003, based on the 2001 census. Without this legislation, the number of electoral districts in northern Ontario would have been reduced from eleven to ten.

Members

Election results

2007 electoral reform referendum

Notes

Sources
 Elections Ontario  1999 results and 2003 results
 Map of riding for 2018 election

Ontario provincial electoral districts
Politics of Thunder Bay